Tony Newton (born April 2, 1979) is a film producer, director, and screenwriter, known for Grindsploitation: The Movie, 60 Seconds to Die and 60 Seconds 2 Die. He is known as the producer of the films Virus of the Dead, Grindsploitation, 60 Seconds to Die, Die Gest: Flesh Feast, VHS Lives: A Schockumentary. He is also the author of the books The Zombie Rule Book and The Zombie Rule Book 2.

References

External links

1979 births
Living people
Horror film directors
Horror writers
Place of birth missing (living people)
Nationality missing